Tell Khardane is a Heavy Neolithic archaeological site of the Qaraoun culture north northeast of Aammiq, Lebanon on the road to Chtaura. Several Heavy Neolithic flints including picks, scrapers, blades and flakes were found in fields that surround the tell mound. Many had been produced using the Levallois technique.

References

Heavy Neolithic sites
Neolithic settlements
Archaeological sites in Lebanon